The 1971 January 31 Surgut Aeroflot Antonov An-12 crash occurred on 31 January 1971, when an Aeroflot Antonov An-12B, aircraft registration CCCP-12996, flying from Roshchino International Airport, Tyumen, in the Soviet Unions Russian Soviet Federated Socialist Republic (RSFSR), crashed  short of the runway on approach to Surgut International Airport, Surgut, RSFSR. An investigation found the aircraft's loss of control was caused by icing.

Aircraft
The aircraft involved in the incident was an Antonov AN-12B with the aircraft registration number 12996 (Factory number - 00347403, a serial number giving some basic information about the aircraft: 00 for the last digit of the year of manufacture - 1970, 34 for the factory of origin - the Tashkent aviation factory, 74 for the production batch and 03 for the individual aircraft within that batch), this aircraft left the production line of the V. P. Chkalov Tashkent aviation production association on the 31st of August 1970 and handed over to the main directorate of the civil air fleet (the governmental organ tasked with overseeing aviation throughout the soviet union), which then sent the aircraft to the 2nd Tuman aviation department of the territorial directorate of the civil air fleet. At the time of the crash the aircraft had completed a total of 391 flying hours.

Accident
CCCP-12996 was sent to transport goods from Tyumen to Surgut, the aircraft's load consisted of 12 metric tons of fresh seafood; Pacific herring packed in boxes. The aircraft was piloted by a crew from the 259th flying squadron, consisting of:
Captain - Konstantin Ivanovich Adamovich
Second officer - Viktor Pavlovich Ponomarov
Navigator - Nikolai Mikhailovich Evlantev
Flight mechanic - Yuri Aleksandrovich Isakov
Radio operator - Anatoli Sergeyevich Andreyev
Steward - Yevgeniy Vasilevich Trifonov
Also on board was a loadmaster.

In response the landing controller informed them that the landing would be at 180° and that the airfield pressure altitude was 766 millimetres of mercury. At this point the crew began to descend to the altitude of the airfield traffic pattern.

The transcript of the crew's communications with the ground controllers records that the aircraft's de-icing system was switched on. In this case it is highly likely that the this shaking was caused by a condition close to flow separation on the wing of the aircraft.

When the AN-12 had exited the left turn, a few seconds later the aircraft again independently entered a slight left turn. The crew countered the left turn with a small steering input to the right, but were quickly forced to steer to the left and then back to the right again since the aircraft had begun to roll from side to side causing a decrease in lift and causing the aircraft to fall. Part of the wreckage including the tail section fell into the lake. All 7 people on board were killed.

Causes 

The commission that investigated the accident concluded that:

Aftermath
In the span of 9 days (22nd and 31st of January 1971) two AN-12 aircraft crashed at Surgut, CCCP-11000 and CCCP-12996. Both crashes occurred under similar circumstances, whilst carrying out the third turn of their landing circuit both aircraft suffered spontaneous rolls due to flow separation on the wing caused by a drop in aerodynamics because of icing, which in turn was caused by ineffective de-icing systems since the hot air intake valve from the engine was not fully open. In order to prevent further catastrophes of the same nature significant improvements were made to the air bleed control systems including an indicator to show the fully open position of the valves. Special tests were also carried out, the results of which helped to clarify the aerodynamic characteristics of the AN-12 during icing. It also lead to changes in many civil aviation governing documents.

References

Aviation accidents and incidents in 1971
Aviation accidents and incidents in the Soviet Union
Airliner accidents and incidents caused by ice
Aeroflot
1971 in the Soviet Union
Accidents and incidents involving the Antonov An-12
January 1971 events in Europe